Gnusovo is a rural locality (a village) in Kopninskoye Rural Settlement, Sobinsky District, Vladimir Oblast, Russia. The population was 23 as of 2010.

Geography 
Gnusovo is located 15 km northwest of Sobinka (the district's administrative centre) by road. Omoforovo is the nearest rural locality.

References 

Rural localities in Sobinsky District